Jean Mana Mamuwené (born 10 October 1947) is a Congolese football midfielder who played for Zaire in the 1974 FIFA World Cup. He also played for SC Imana.

References

External links
FIFA profile

1947 births
Africa Cup of Nations-winning players
Democratic Republic of the Congo footballers
Democratic Republic of the Congo international footballers
Association football midfielders
Daring Club Motema Pembe players
1974 FIFA World Cup players
1974 African Cup of Nations players
Living people
21st-century Democratic Republic of the Congo people